The Instituto Nacional de Antropología e Historia (INAH, National Institute of Anthropology and History) is a Mexican federal government bureau established in 1939 to guarantee the research, preservation, protection, and promotion of the prehistoric, archaeological, anthropological, historical, and paleontological heritage of Mexico. Its creation has played a key role in preserving the Mexican cultural heritage. Its current national headquarters are housed in the Palace of the Marqués del Apartado.

INAH and the Instituto Nacional de Bellas Artes y Literatura are tasked with cataloging and protecting monuments and buildings regarded as cultural patrimony. INAH is entrusted with 'archaeological' (pre-Hispanic and paleontological) and 'historical' (post-Conquest 16th to 19th centuries) structures, zones and remnants, while INBAL is entrusted with 'artistic' buildings and monuments (properties that are of significant aesthetic value as deemed by a commission). Worthy edifices are catalogued in the Registro Público de Monumentos y Zonas Arqueológicos e Históricos (Public Register of Archeological and Historic Monuments and Zones).

Currently, the INAH carries out its work through a Technical Secretariat which supervises the performance of its main duties and whose tasks are distributed among its seven National Coordination Offices and 31 Regional Centers throughout the states of the Mexico.

This bureau is responsible for the over 110,000 historical monuments, built between the 16th and 19th centuries, and for 29,000 of Mexico's estimated 200,000 pre-Columbian archeological zones found throughout the country. One hundred and fifty of the archeological sites are open to the public.

The INAH also supervises over a hundred museums. These are found across the country and are categorized according to the extension and quality of their collections, geographical locations, and number of visitors. Over 500 Teotihuacan murals are in storage at the INAH.

Emeriti 

The INAH recognises its most famous researchers with the Emeritus degree. As of 2009, only 16 individuals have been named emeritus researchers:

 Dra. Beatriz Barba Ahuatzin
 Dra. Beatriz Braniff Cornejo
 Dr. Fernando Cámara Barbachano
 Dra. Johanna Faulhaber Kamman (1911–2000)
 Arqlgo. Francisco González Rul Hernández C. (1920–2005)
 Dra. Doris Heydenreich Zelz (1915–2006)
 Dra. Sonia Lombardo Pérez Salazar
 Mtro. Leonardo Manrique Castañeda (1934–2003)
 Mtro. Eduardo Matos Moctezuma
 Dra. Margarita Nolasco Armas
 Dr. Julio César Olive Negrete
 Mtra. Alicia Olivera Sedano
 Dr. Román Piña Chan (1920–2001)
 Mtro. Arturo Romano Pacheco
 Mtro. Javier Romero Molina (1910–1986)
 Mtro. Constantino Reyes-Valerio (1922–2006)

See also 
 Museo Nacional de Antropología
 Doris Heyden
 Returned Treasures Program

References

External links
  of INAH 
Escuela Nacional de Conservación, Restauración y Museografía (archived 27 September 2013)

Government of Mexico
History museums in Mexico
Anthropology museums
Mesoamerican studies
Pre-Columbian studies
Heritage registers in Mexico
World Digital Library partners